Thomas Foket (born 25 September 1994) is a Belgian professional footballer who plays as a right-back for Ligue 1 club Stade de Reims and the Belgium national team.

Club career

Dilbeek Sport
At age 16, Foket was in the first team of Fourth Division side Dilbeek Sport. At the end of the 2011–12 season, he was solicited by different Belgian Pro League teams, of which were AA Gent, Club Brugge and R.S.C. Anderlecht. He chose to play in Gent, as it was the best way to combine finishing his studies and football training.

Gent
In March 2012, Foket signed a two-year contract with Gent. He made his debut for Gent in the second qualifying round of the Europa League, against FC Differdange 03, replacing Mohamed Messoudi in the 79th minute.

In July 2012, Gent extended the contract of Foket until 2016. In October 2014, Foket extended his contract until 2018.

Upon his return from loan at Oostende, Foket was transformed to a right midfielder.

Oostende
In the season 2013–14, Foket was on loan at K.V. Oostende, which had just been promoted to the Pro League

Reims
In August 2018, Foket joined Ligue 1 side Stade de Reims on a five-year contract. The transfer fee was reported as €3.5 million.

International career
In November 2016 Foket received his first call-up to the senior Belgium squad for matches against Netherlands and Estonia. Foket made his formal debut for Belgium on 10 November 2016 as a half-time substitute in a friendly with the Netherlands that finished 1–1.

Honours
Gent
Belgian Pro League: 2014–15
Belgian Super Cup: 2015

References

External links

1994 births
Living people
Belgian footballers
Association football fullbacks
Association football midfielders
Belgium international footballers
Belgium under-21 international footballers
Belgium youth international footballers
Belgian Pro League players
Ligue 1 players
K.A.A. Gent players
K.V. Oostende players
Stade de Reims players
Belgian expatriate footballers
Belgian expatriate sportspeople in France
Expatriate footballers in France